Paul Beaudry (born 1960) is Professor and Canada Research Chair in the UBC Department of Economics at the University of British Columbia. His main fields of research are macroeconomics, the economics of technical change and labour economics. He is also a Fellow of the Bank of Canada.

Beaudry has extensive experience in his career as an academic professor. Obtained his Ph.D. in economics from Princeton University, New Jersey, USA. After graduating from Princeton, Beaudry held several prominent faculty positions from a number of prestigious universities, these include: Oxford University, Boston University, and the Universite de Montreal. Beaudry had also been commissioned as a visiting professor at the Paris-Sorbonne, Toulouse School of Economics, and MIT.

On December 4, 2018, the Board of Directors of the Bank of Canada announced the appointment of Beaudry as Deputy Governor, effective February 18, 2019.

Awards and distinctions
 Fellow of the Bank of Canada (2005)
 Fellow of the Royal Society of Canada (2004)

References

External links
 Faculty.arts.ubc.ca

Fellows of All Souls College, Oxford
Academic staff of the Vancouver School of Economics
1960 births
Living people
Canada Research Chairs
20th-century Canadian economists
21st-century Canadian economists